Kleinia galpinii is a species of flowering plant in the family Asteraceae. The species name commemorates E. E. Galpin. It has gained the Royal Horticultural Society's Award of Garden Merit as a warm temperate greenhouse ornamental.

References

External links

galpinii
Flora of Zimbabwe
Flora of Swaziland
Flora of the Northern Provinces
Flora of KwaZulu-Natal
Plants described in 1905